Transcription factor MafA is a protein that in humans is encoded by the MAFA gene. It is a member of the Maf family of transcription factors.

MAFA is phosphorylated sequentially on four serine/threonine residues by GSK-3 kinase. These phosphorylations activate MAFA transcription and trigger its degradation in the proteasome. Altering these post-translationnal modifications leads to severe pathological consequences. Mutation of these  residues  is perinatally lethal in mice, and  mutation of the Ser64Phe priming site was reported to induce familial diabetes mellitus and insulinomatosis in humans.

MAFA assists in insulin regulation 
An in vivo study on mice proved MafA binds to the promoter in an insulin gene to regulate insulin transcription in response to serum glucose levels. MafA is a  β cell-specific activator, which differentiates it from other transcription factors involved with insulin gene expression. It helps regulate the β cells involved with insulin secretion primarily by maintaining β cell metabolism. The amount of MafA in the β cells is regulated by levels of glucose and oxidative stress.

Interactions
MafA (gene) has been shown to interact with NEUROD1 and Pdx1. MafA works with Pdx1 to activate the insulin gene.

MAFA in neurons 
In addition to its expression in pancreatic ßcells, MAFA is also expressed in specific subsets of  excitatory and inhibitory neurons. In the peripheric nervous system, it is expressed in touch mechanoreceptors.  In the central nervous system,  Mafa is expressed in sensory neurons in the spinal cord and trigeminal nucleus, as well as in the olfactory bulb. It is also present in ventral inhibitory neurons of the spinal cord (Renshaw cells) and in brainstem inhibitory neurons controlling  mouse neonatal apneas.

References

Further reading